Carmelita McGrath is a Canadian writer residing in St. John's, Newfoundland and Labrador. She writes poetry, children's literature, and novels. Along with writing, McGrath is also an editor, teacher, researcher, and communications consultant.

Life 

McGrath was born in Branch, St. Mary's Bay. She received a Bachelor of Arts and a Bachelor of Education from the Memorial University of Newfoundland. She has been involved in several writing groups, including the Writer's Alliance of Newfoundland and Labrador, The Writer's Union, and the League of Canadian Poets. She also served as Board Member and Chair of the Newfoundland and Labrador Arts Council. McGrath is a former editor of TickleAce magazine and member of the Waterlily magazine's editorial collective. She edited both fiction and non-fiction pieces for the Killick Press.

Works 

 Poems on Land and Water (1992)
 Walking to Shenak (1994)
 Their Lives and Times (1995)
 To The New World (1997)
 Stranger Things Have Happened (1999)
 The-Dog-Next-Year (2001)
 Ghost Poems (2001)
 The Boston Box (2003)
 Vistas (2005)
 Weather's Edge: A Compendium of Women's Lives in Newfoundland and Labrador (2005)
 Many Friends, One World (2008)
 Escape Velocity (2013)

Awards 

 1998 Atlantic Poetry Prize for To The New World
 2000 Newfoundland and Labrador Book Award for Stranger Things Have Happened
 Finalist for the 2000 Thomas Raddall Atlantic Fiction Award
 2015 EJ Pratt Award for Escape Velocity
 Winterset Award Nominee for Escape Velocity

References 

Canadian women children's writers
Canadian women poets
Canadian women novelists
Writers from Newfoundland and Labrador
Living people
People from Newfoundland (island)
Year of birth missing (living people)